The Reserve Division of Xinzhou() was activated in July 1985, at Xinzhou, Shanxi. The division was composed of 3 infantry regiments and 1 artillery regiment. In November 1985 the division was redesignated as the Reserve Infantry Division of Xinzhou().

The division was then composed of:
1st Infantry Regiment
2nd Infantry Regiment
3rd Infantry Regiment - Wutai County
Artillery Regiment

The division was disbanded in 1999.

References

Reserve divisions of the People's Liberation Army
Military units and formations established in 1984